Verpelét is a town since 2013, with 3,780 inhabitants end 2014, in Heves county (megye), in the Northern Hungary region.

Geography

History 

The VERPELET post office opened on 13 October 1867, and was dependent on Postal Directory Pest.

References

External links

  in Hungarian

Populated places in Heves County